Entratico is a comune (municipality) in the Province of Bergamo in the Italian region of Lombardy, located about  northeast of Milan and about  east of Bergamo. As of 31 December 2004, it had a population of 1,620 and an area of 4.1 km².

Entratico borders the following municipalities: Berzo San Fermo, Borgo di Terzo, Foresto Sparso, Luzzana, Trescore Balneario, Zandobbio.

Demographic evolution

References